KMMQ (1020 AM, "La Nueva 99.5 y 1020") is a radio station licensed to serve Plattsmouth, Nebraska, United States. The station is owned by NRG Media and the license is held by NRG License Sub, LLC, headquartered in Cedar Rapids, Iowa.  Its studios are located at Dodge Street and 50th Avenue in Midtown Omaha, while its transmitter site is located near Glenwood, Iowa.

KMMQ broadcasts a Regional Mexican music format to the Omaha metropolitan area.

History
This station began broadcasting on October 26, 1970, as daytime-only KOTD with 250 watts of power on 1000 kHz under the ownership of the Platte Broadcasting Company, Inc. The station was run by J.P. Warga as president and general manager.  By 1979, the station was being run by Charles Warga as president and general manager and Jo Warga as comptroller.

In August 1994, KOTD applied to the FCC to change frequencies to the current 1020 kHz and increase daytime power to 1,000 watts. The construction permit was granted in October 1994 and the station received its license to cover for the new frequency and signal power on August 22, 1996.

In April 1998, Platte Broadcasting Company, Inc., reached an agreement to transfer the broadcast license for this station to Warga Broadcasting, LLC.  The deal was approved by the FCC on April 28, 1998, and the transaction was consummated on May 8, 1998.

In November 2000, Warga Broadcasting, LLC (Charles Warga, member/manager) agreed to sell KOTD to Waitt Radio, Inc. (Norman W. Waitt Jr., chairman/owner) for a reported sale price of $750,000.  The deal was approved by the FCC on December 20, 2000, and the transaction was consummated on January 17, 2001.

In May 2001, KOTD applied to the FCC for another power increase, this time to the current 50,000 watt daytime authorization. In March 2002, the permit was amended to add 1,400 watt nighttime operation as well.  The station received its updated license on June 4, 2002.

On February 14, 2002, the station changed its call letters to KKSC for Sarpy County then changed again on April 22, 2003, to the legendary KOIL callsign. This accompanied an April 2003 switch to a classic country music format branded on-air as "KOIL Country 1020 AM".

In 2005, the entire Waitt Radio station group was transferred to NRG Media, also owned by Norman W. Waitt Jr. Internal corporate transfers in 2005 and 2006 saw the license pass to Waitt Omaha, LLC, then to Waittcorp Investments, LLC, before current license holder NRG Media, LLC, on March 14, 2006.

On January 1, 2009, the station was assigned new call letters KMMQ as the KOIL callsign was moved to a sister station on 1180 AM.

References

External links

Hispanic and Latino American culture in Nebraska
MMQ
Regional Mexican radio stations in the United States
Radio stations established in 1970
1970 establishments in Nebraska
NRG Media radio stations